Gomme is a surname, and may refer to:

 Alan Gomme-Duncan (1893–1963)
 Alice Gomme (1853–1938)
 Andor Gomme (1930–2008)
 Arnold Wycombe Gomme (1886–1959)
 George Gomme (1912–1996)
 (George) Laurence Gomme
 Bernard de Gomme

See also

Gomme (food)
Gomme syrup